Chenar Sukhteh or Chenar-e Sukhteh may refer to:
 Chenar Sukhteh, Bavanat, Fars Province
 Chenar Sukhteh, Dadenjan, Firuzabad County, Fars Province
 Chenar Sukhteh, Khvajehei, Firuzabad County, Fars Province
 Chenar-e Sukhteh, Jahrom, Fars Province
 Chenar Sukhteh, Mashhad, Razavi Khorasan Province
 Chenar Sukhteh, Sarakhs, Razavi Khorasan Province

See also
 Sukhteh Chenar